The Swansea Canal (Welsh: Camlas Abertawe) was a canal constructed by the Swansea Canal Navigation Company between 1794 and 1798, running for  from Swansea to Hen Neuadd, Abercraf in South Wales. It was steeply graded, and 36 locks were needed to enable it to rise  over its length. The main cargos were coal, iron and steel, and the enterprise was profitable.

Sold to the Great Western Railway in 1873, it continued to make a profit until 1895. A period of decline followed, with the last commercial traffic using the waterway in 1931. Subsequently, parts of it were closed and filled in under a succession of owners, but around  remain in water. The Swansea Canal Society, formed in 1981, is actively involved in plans for its restoration.

Background
The canal was constructed to transport coal from the upper Swansea Valley to Swansea docks for export, or for use in the early metallurgical industries in the Lower Swansea Valley. The period 1830-1840 saw the development of towns and villages around the canal: Abercraf, Clydach, Penwyllt, Pontardawe, Ynysmeudwy, Ystalyfera and Ystradgynlais came into being as early industries developed at those locations.

In 1817, Fforest Fawr (English: Great Forest of Brecon) was enclosed and divided into fields. The Crown decided to sell it in 1812 to help fund the Napoleonic Wars, but local people with rights to graze sheep and cattle on the common land objected.  were sold to cover the cost of the Enclosure Commission, and around one third of the total area was offered for sale in 1819. Some two-thirds of this land was bought by an industrialist and London businessman called John Christie. Christie had already developed a limestone quarry at Penwyllt, and decided to develop lime kilns there as well. In 1820 he moved to Brecon, and developed the Brecon Forest Tramroad. Before he could complete the system, he went bankrupt.

History
With the development of Swansea harbour from the 1760s, consideration was given as to how the rich mineral resources of the Tawe valley could be moved to the coast. In 1790, William Padley surveyed the valley for a possible canal route, and in 1791, the passing of an Act of Parliament to authorise the nearby Neath Canal resulted in calls for a public meeting. A meeting held on 5 April 1793 appointed the canal engineer Thomas Sheasby to conduct a survey. The plans were opposed by the Duke of Beaufort and other traders, who wanted the canal to terminate further up the river near Landore and Morriston, where they already had wharfs. Swansea Corporation favoured the route into Swansea, and offered to contribute towards its cost, whereupon the Duke, his son the Marquess of Worcester and the Duke's agent withdrew their subscriptions. This action stirred others to subscribe, and £52,000 was raised almost immediately.

Ultimately, a compromise was reached, with the canal terminating in Swansea, but the Duke constructing  of canal from Nant Rhydyfiliast to Nant Felin, on which he was allowed to charge tolls, which could not exceed the tolls charged by the canal company for use of the rest of the canal. The Duke's section was called the Trewyddfa Canal, but was part of the main line. An Act of Parliament authorising the construction was passed on 23 May 1794, and the Swansea Canal Company were empowered to raise £60,000 by issuing shares, and a further £30,000 if required. They were also authorised to build tramways to any places within  of the canal, and canal branches to places within . The new company took the unusual step of appointing all shareholders who held five or more shares to a steering committee, rather than electing a management committee, and of building the canal using direct labour, rather than appointing contractors. Charles Roberts was the engineer in charge of the project, and was assisted by Thomas Sheasby.

Civil engineering works included 36 locks and five aqueducts to carry the canal across major tributaries of the River Tawe, at Clydach, Pontardawe, Ynysmeudwy, Ystalyfera, and Cwmgiedd. The locks raised the canal from near sea level at Swansea through  to reach Abercraf. At Swansea, wharfs were built alongside the river, where cargo could be transhipped into coasters. Unusually for such projects, the final cost was well within budget, with the project costing £51,602 up to mid-1798. The steering committee approach obviously worked well, as it was retained until the company was wound up.

Operations
The last narrowboat built on this canal was 'Grace Darling' in 1918 at the Godre'r Graig boat yard.

The opening of the canal caused an increase in industrial activity along the valley, with a number of manufacturing companies setting up works by its banks. Four short branch canals were constructed, and a network of tramways gradually linked mines and quarries to the canal. In 1804, 54,235 tons of coal and culm were carried, and profits were sufficient to enable a dividend of 3 per cent to be paid. Receipts and dividends rose steadily, reaching £10,522 and 14 per cent in 1840, while in 1860 they were £13,800 and 18 per cent. There are few records of how much traffic was carried, but estimates based on the amount of coal and culm shipped from Swansea Docks suggest around 386,000 tons in 1839. The opening of the Tennant Canal to Swansea Docks in 1824 resulted in the Swansea Canal's riverside wharfs being improved, and tolls were reduced to maintain trade levels.

The harbour facilities at Swansea were upgraded in 1852, when the river Tawe was diverted into a new channel to the east, and the original channel, which included the trans-shipment wharfs, became a floating harbour. A lock was constructed to give the canal boats direct access to the half-tide basin above the North Dock, and a loop of the canal was constructed along the edge of the new harbour.

Decline

The first suggestions that a railway should be constructed along the Tawe Valley, which would be in direct competition to the canal, were made in 1830. More serious railway proposals were made in 1845, when the Canal Company agreed to lease the canal to the Welsh Midland Railway for £4,264 per year, but the scheme foundered. Another scheme to lease the canal to the Neath and Brecon Railway for £9,000 per year in 1864 also foundered. The 1860s were a hard time for the canal, as the steel industry gradually replaced the iron industry, and ironworks contracted or closed. In 1871, the Company approached the Great Western Railway, and negotiated a price of £107,666 for the main Swansea Canal, and £40,000 for the Duke of Beaufort's Trewyddfa Canal. The sale took place on 31 January 1873.

Rather than run it down, the Great Western Railway ran the canal well, and it remained profitable until 1895, when losses were first reported, though it recovered a little between 1898 and 1902. The tonnage of coal carried on the canal was very high, with 385,000 tons transported down the canal to Swansea in 1888 alone. The last commercial cargo carried on the Swansea Canal was in 1931, when coal was conveyed from Clydach to Swansea. Boats continued to operate on the canal after that date but only for maintenance work, with horse-drawn boats last recorded at Clydach in 1958.

The canal was gradually abandoned, under the terms of a series of Acts of Parliament, starting with the Great Western Railway Acts of 1928 and 1931. The canal was nationalised in 1947 and became part of the British Transport Commission, whose Acts of 1949 and 1957 brought further closures. The remainder was closed under the terms of the British Transport Commission Act of 1962, when control of the canal passed to British Waterways, who remained responsible for the maintenance of the waterway and its structures until 2012, when they were superseded by the Canal and River Trust.

Present
In-filling of much of the canal has taken place in the past 50 years. The northern section was affected by the creation of the A4067 road around Ystradgynlais, while the southern section below Clydach had been infilled by 1982, as part of the work associated with the A4067 dual carriageway. Just  of the canal remains in water, from Clydach to Pontardawe where it is now a popular trail and is part of route 43 of the National Cycle Network.

The canal empties from an aqueduct into the Lower Clydach River at the point where it joins the River Tawe. A project is underway to dredge the canal and to remove the Japanese knotweed that grows extensively around the Swansea Valley. The canal is an important habitat for water birds and for eels.  Local youngsters from Clydach often set up fishing off the banks of the canal to catch the eels.

In 1981, the Swansea Canal Society was formed, and have been working towards restoration of the remaining sections of the canal. It has done much to improve the physical environment of the canal, and have proposed the development of a  cruising route in conjunction with a restored Neath and Tennant Canal.

On 23 October 1998, after heavy rainfall, water levels in the canal rose, and at Pontardawe, spilled over the towpath and down an embankment. The flow caused the bank to fail, and the breach caused extensive flooding.

In early 2019, the canal received a grant of £320,000 from the Welsh Government's Rural Development programme. This section was already used by a canoe hire business, but the extra depth would allow it to be used by a trip boat, and as a destination for trail boats. Glandwr Cymru was responsible for organising the dredging, with work due to start in the autumn of 2019. Conservation of a number of the structures along the canal would also be funded by the grant, which marks the first stage of a ten-year plan to market the canal as a heritage, visitor and leisure destination.

Route

Northern section
The upper terminus of the Swansea Canal was a large basin situated to the west of Aber-craf, close to an 'S'-bend in the River Tawe. There was an iron works nearby, and two tramways linked it to limestone quarries near the summit of Cribarth, a hill to the north-east. Differences in level were handled by 18 inclined planes, built at various times between 1794, when the canal opened, and the 1890s, when quarrying ceased. The main line built by John Christie in the 1820s included four consecutive inclines. The Rheola Arms public house was sandwiched between the basin and the river, and the Lamb and Flag Inn was located on the south bank of the river, just across a bridge. The canal headed south-west, to pass through the two Cae'r Bont Locks at Ynys-bydafau. There was a brickworks, some saw pits, and a lime kiln by the second lock, as well as a dock and dry dock, built by Christie in 1825. From the dock, a tramway crossed the river and ascended to Mynydd y Drum by three inclined planes. Parts of it were originally the Gwaunclawdd Colliery tramroad, and although much of Mynydd y Drum has been stripped away by opencast mining, the entrance to the colliery survives. The modern A4067 road runs along the canal from the basin to just after the first lock, and then veers southwards to cross the river.

The canal continues to the west of the river, passing through the first of the three Ynys Uchaf Locks, before it turned sharply to the west, where there were two more locks. The road recrosses the river and once more follows the course of the canal from the bend. Before reaching Ynys Isaf, there was a much wider section of canal. The two Ynys Isaf Locks were located to the south west of the hamlet, either side of the Ship Inn. The first of several aqueducts carried the canal over the River Giedd, where there were limekilns. Ystradgynlais Lock was near Bryn-y-groes, as the establishment of the town of Ystradgynlais to the east of the river was a later development. There was another wider section, which by 1878 was already marked "Old Quarry", but had a coal stage associated with Pant-mawr Colliery by 1904. The Star Inn and the Ynys Cedwyn Arms were both located on the east bank. At Gorof there were two more locks, one to the north and the other to the south of the bridge. There was also a waterwheel by the second lock, one of 42 positioned along the canal.

By 1904, a tramway from the Pant-mawr Colliery ran along the western bank of the canal, and crossed the head of the lower lock to reach railway sidings from the Ynyscedwyn Branch of the Midland Railway. There were two more locks further to the west at Pen-y-Gorof. The Ynyscedwyn Branch met the Ynyscedwyn Works Branch near the lower one, and crossed over its tail. The railway followed the course of the earlier Claypon's Tramway Extension, built by Joseph Claypon between 1832 and 1834. He had become the owner of the Brecon Forest Tramways in 1829, on the bankruptcy of Christie. It linked the Drum Colliery to Gurnos Wharf, and he intended to use locomotives on it, although locomotive working from end to end would not have been possible, because there was a large incline in the middle. This was powered, rather than being self-acting, as he wanted to develop traffic northwards from Gurnos onto the Brecon Forest Tramways. The double-track Ynysgedwyn incline is one of the most impressive structures of its type in south Wales which still survive, rising  along its  length. The gradient increases from 1 in 8 at its foot to 1 in 5 at its head, where there are the remains of an engine house. Just below the bridge where the tramway crossed the canal, a branch canal was built to serve the Ynysgedwyn Ironworks. It curves along the edge of a sportsground and playing field, and the former towing path is now a public footpath.

Continuing to the south west, the main line of the canal then turned towards the south. The A4067 road leaves the canal briefly, to follow the track of the railway, and the canal is marked by a minor road and public footpath, until it reaches the roundabout on the B4599 Gurnos Road. A short length of the canal survives below the roundabout, where it crosses the River Twrch on an aqueduct. This was one of the first in Britain to be built using hydraulic mortar, and was restored in 1995, although it contains no water. There were two locks at Gurnos, one by a corn mill and the second by the railway station. The A4067 rejoins the canal bed below the station, and is flanked by Canal Terrace to the west. There was a small brickworks by the terrace, and the much larger Ystalyfera Iron and Tinplate Works a little further along the canal. This included a row of eleven blast furnaces, making it the largest such installation in South Wales, and the tinplate works was the largest in the world.

The canal passed to the west of the Tinplate Works, but the road passes along its eastern edge. From Ystalyfera to Godre'r-graig, the canal is virtually straight, but the road is offset slightly to the east. The road has made the channel narrower, but the remains of six of the seven locks are still visible, and there are other industrial buildings which were associated with the canal still in existence. By Godre'r-graig, the canal turns to the west, but the road continues southwards. Around  of the canal between the parting and Ynysmeudwy is owned by Neath Port Talbot County Borough Council, and is managed as a nature reserve.

Middle section

Most of the next  is in water, and some of it has been restored. After the unrestored Cilmaengwyn lock, the canal is crossed by the B4603 road and almost immediately crosses the Cwmdu Aqueduct. The minor bridge below the aqueduct was known as Pottery Bridge, for there was a pottery nearby from 1850. China clay was brought up the canal by barge, and a wide variety of items were manufactured by the workforce, which consisted of 112 people at its peak. Many of the items made are now collectible. By 1898, its site was occupied by a tinplate works, which was served by a siding connecting to a railway on the far side of the river.

Ynysmeudwy Upper and Lower Locks are below the bridge. By 1878, the lower lock was crossed by a railway connecting the Cwm-nant-du Collieries to a Patent Fuel Works, by the lock, and continuing over the river to join the railway line. The collieries were disused by 1898, and only a short section of the railway line remained, as the link over the lock and river had been removed. Next came a branch from the main line of the canal to the side of the river, with a dock at the end. A tramway connected the dock to the Waun-y-coed Colliery on the south bank of the river, and there were tramway connections to the Cwm-nant-llwyd Colliery to the south and another to the north-east. The branch is clearly visible from the bridge where the A road crosses, but there are no structures visible any longer of the dock itself and it is difficult to walk to this section due to the growth of brambles etc. The canal is navigable from Ynysmeudwy Lower Lock to Pontardawe, where further progress is blocked by Ynysgylennen Bridge, which has been lowered. The canal continues a little further, passing under Herbert Street Bridge and over Upper Clydach Aqueduct, before disappearing into a culvert.

The culverted section once contained a dock and the two Pontardawe Locks. The Pontardawe Tin Plate Works was located immediately to the east of the canal between the locks, and by 1878 was served by railway sidings which crossed the river to reach the works. Approaching Trebanos, the canal re-emerges from its culvert, to reach Trebanos Lock and Green Lock. The Pheasant Bush Tin Works beside Trebanos Lock was disused by 1898. By Coedgwilym Park, the canal turns briefly to the west, to pass under the B4603 Pontardawe Road bridge, and then there was another short culverted section beneath a council depot, which was the location of a lock. You could walk around the council depot and the drop in level between each end was quite noticeable. There were suggestions that lock 6 was still intact underneath the depot at the point where the canal dropped into the culvert through large metal grids. The council depot has since been closed, and the towpath reinstated through the site. Some work has been done to investigate the lock, and although the top of the lock walls were removed at the time the depot was built, what was left was carefully repointed, preserving the integrity of the lower walls. There was a short tramway from below the lock to Ynys-penllwch Graig-ola Colliery. Mond Lock was next, with the B4603 crossing the tail of the lock. Below the bridge is the Mond Nickel Works, set up in 1900 after the chemist Dr Ludwig Mond discovered a process for producing pure nickel. Nickel ore was imported from Canada, and the site was chosen because there were supplies of anthracite coal, water, transport links to Swansea, and an available labour force. The canal crosses the Lower Clydach River on an aqueduct, which discharges water into the river, and the watered section comes to an abrupt halt about  further on.

Southern section
The next lock was located at Ynystawe in the industrial estate to the south-west of the current terminus. In 1879, it was surrounded by a gas works, a brick works, Clydach Foundry, a tinplate works, and a network of railway sidings radiating from near Cwm Clydach railway station. The canal turned to the south, to run beside the river, and then to the south-west, where it ran parallel to the Swansea Vale Railway. The course of both is now marked by the A4067 road. Junction 45 on the M4 motorway is built over the route of the canal. At Tirpenry, the canal swerved to the west, while the railway passed along the eastern edge of the Midland Tinplate Works and the Morriston Tinplate Works. The A4067 follows the course of the railway at this point, but resumes following the bed of the canal a little further to the south. From this point southwards, the canal was surrounded by a large variety of industrial works around 1900. This included the Tir Penry chemical works and the Union chemical works; Morriston Pottery and Copper Pit, which was a coal pit; Forest spleter works and Morriston spelter works; Rose copper works, Plas Marl coal pit and Landore copper works; Millbrook iron works, Landore tinplate works and Landore Siemens steel works. A tramway crossed the canal to reach the Hafod copper works, a little further to the east of the canal. Next was Hafod phosphate works, where there was a lock with a dock just above it on the eastern bank, and Hafod nickel and cobalt works, where there was another lock, with dry docks on the western bank below it. The final section of the canal is marked by the location of Morfa Road, running beside the railway tracks that lead to Swansea's High Street railway station. To the east was the North Dock, and there was a network of wharfs and two more locks, one leading into the dock, with a final loop built to service the main part of the North Dock. The North Dock was closed in 1930, as a result of the development of new docks to the east of the Tawe, although the half-tide basin at its southern end remained in use until 1969.

Restoration of the original route to Clydach would not be possible, but since the construction of a barrage across Swansea Bay, water levels in the river are maintained at all states of the tide, and so it could be used to reach Llansamlet, from where the Fendrod River could be canalised to reach a large lake.

Points of interest

See also

Canals of the United Kingdom
History of the British canal system

Bibliography

References

External links
 Swansea Canal Society registered charity
 Canal and River Trust
 Swansea Community Boat Trust
 www.geograph.co.uk : photos of the Swansea Canal
 BBC Wales feature on the canal

1798 establishments in Wales
Buildings and structures in Neath Port Talbot
Transport in Swansea
History of Swansea
Canals in Wales
Swansea Valley
Canals opened in 1798